Sisurcana aluminias is a species of moth of the  family Tortricidae. It is found in Colombia and Ecuador in the provinces of Cotopaxi and Carchi.

References

Moths described in 1912
Sisurcana